Arulanandam Yesuvadiyan Samuel Gnanam popularly known as A. Y. S. Gnanam(5 May 1922 - 3 January 2007) was a successful Sri Lankan business tycoon who founded St. Anthony's Group among other.

Gnanam in his tender age ventured into selling scrap iron on the road and eventually built the multi-billion worth St. Anthony's Group.

Early life

Gnanam was born in a small village Soukyapuram in Tirunelveli District, Madras Presidency, British India(in the present-day Tamil Nadu, India) in a cristian Nadar Family.

Gnanam went to a small school in Soukyapuram and did well in his studies. Since the school only had classes up to fourth grade, his mother sent him to a bigger school in a close by town. He spent around one year at that school and returned back home due to accommodation issues.

He reached British Ceylon when he was 9 year-old and joined his father and brother who were working in a small town Horana.

In the 1930s he attended a night school to learn English, whilst working with his brother in a shop in Kottawa, spending half of his monthly salary for his studies.

Gnanam on his brother’s request used to go thrice a week with goods loaded on a bullock cart, to farmers markets around villages in Kottawa. He was given two rupees as his wage for each market; he used the wage to buy produce from Chena farms along the way and sold them at the market, and made profit for himself.

Career

Gnanam started to sell scrap iron on the road at a very tender age. After the Second World War there were many British vessels abandoned in Trincomalee. He saw this as an opportunity and started to buy scrap from these vessels and exporting them to India. 

Gnanam then started a hardware business - St. Anthony's Hardware, where he sold scrap iron. The British were nice to him and gave him a good price; the business started to grow gradually and he started to import a number of other hardware related products.   

He went into trading reputed international brands Grundig and Sanyo in Sri Lanka in the 1950s.

Gnanam was invited by Sir Cyril De Zoysa to manage ailing roofing manufacturing company Sri Lanka Asbestos Products (today known as Rhino Roofing). He turned to European manufacturers for equipment to upgrade the production line and to improve product quality. He eventually turned it into a successful venture.

In the late 1960s and early 1970s, the Government discouraged imported items coming into the market and promoted local industry and nationalisation. Gnanam saw another opportunity to begin manufacturing in Sri Lanka. He invested in equipment from international sources including from Germany that were known to have the best technology for manufacturing and produced high quality nuts, bolts and hinges and later PVC pipes, fittings and other. 

During the same period Gnanam realised that there was a big shortage of textiles in Sri Lanka. Therefore, he formed a joint venture with Mitsui Company and established the Ceylon Synthetic Textile Mills or Cyntex and used high quality machineries from  Switzerland and produced quality fabrics. This was the first public company that was initiated with Japanese collaboration in Sri Lanka and he was one of the first entrepreneurs to get World Bank funding. 

Gnanam also initiated Asian Cotton Mills. During his time as Chairperson of the Textile Manufacturing Association, he campaigned for positive government policy changes in the local textile manufacturing industry.

He exported gems under the scheme known as CRA (Convertible Rupee Account) to earn foreign exchange to fund import of consumer goods. In fact, he sometimes did not make much margin on the export of gems, instead making more margin on the consumer goods he imported.

When markets opened in the 1970s, he diversified into apparel, employing as many as 5,000 people in an enterprise to manufacture and export sweaters to the West. 

Gnanam started Tokyo Cement as his second biggest public company in investment, expanding the manufacturing of building materials, anticipating a boom in the construction sector and this still lays the foundations for the building industry in Sri Lanka.

Charisma
When thugs robbed Gnanam’s house during the riots in 1983, they chased him out of his house. As he was just with a sarong and vest (his norm), the thugs sympathized and offered him a trouser and a shirt. Gnanam told them - 

"Not to worry. I came like this from India and used to go from house to house buying old newspapers in this same attire. I am prepared to go with the same dress to the refugee camp."

Gnanam was extremely resilient, not succumbing to pressure from friends and family when several enterprises started by him were affected by the riots in 1983; he stood firm, rebuilt and restarted.

Philanthropist
Gnanam was a silent philanthropist who assisted schools, hospitals, orphanages and the needy people.

Awards and recognition
Gnanam was bestowed with three national titles, Deshabandu in 1986, Deshamanya in 1994 and Vishwa Prasadini in 1996.

Legacy

Public image

Memorials

 The A.Y.S. Gnanam Village Heartbeat Empowerment Centre in Dambulla

 AYS GNANAM ELDERS’ HOME

Bibliography
 
The author Jey Gnanam mentions, “I had the opportunity to visit my father’s place of birth Soukyapuram in 2011, and to see the little kudisai (hut) he spent his boyhood in. A feeling of awe and disbelief overwhelmed me at the sight of it.”

References

External links 

 Profile at St. Anthony’s Industries Group
 Profile at St. Anthony’s Hardware 

1922 births
2007 deaths
People from British India
People from British Ceylon
Tamil billionaires
Tamil entrepreneurs
Tamil businesspeople
20th-century Indian businesspeople
Businesspeople from Tamil Nadu
Indian Tamil people
Deshamanya
Indian emigrants to Sri Lanka